The Game Act 1831 (1 & 2 Will 4 c 32) is an Act of the Parliament of the United Kingdom which was passed to protect game birds by establishing a close season when they could not be legally taken. The Act also established the need for game licences and the appointing of gamekeepers. The Act still covers the protection of game birds to this day.

Game covered by the Game Acts
The Game Act designated certain species as game birds, and their open season (when they may be shot):

 Red grouse (Moor Game), 12 August – 10 December
 Black grouse (Black Game), 20 August – 10 December
 Pheasant, 1 October – 1 February
 Partridge, 1 September – 1 February

As well as adhering to the seasons, game may not be taken on Sundays or Christmas Day.

The great bustard was protected under this Act, with its open season decided as 1 September – 1 March. This protection was little use however, as the great bustard became extinct in Great Britain in the 1830s. It is currently part of a reintroduction programme.

Capercaillie are not protected in this Act as they were extinct in Britain at the time. They were reintroduced to Scotland in 1837.

Brown hares are mentioned in this act but have no closed season. Two hares Acts were passed in the 19th century. The first in 1848 permitted the issuing of game licenses, where hunting could take place, and the banning of baiting with poison. The second in Act in 1892, among other things, prohibited the sale of hare meat between March and July which is the animals' breeding season.

Game licences
The Act made it lawful to take game only with the provision of a game licence. Also, to deal in game the Act made an excise licence necessary. 

The Game Licence was abolished in England and Wales on 1 August 2007, as well as the need for game dealers licences and the law changed to make selling game, except hare, year round legal.  In Scotland, it is still necessary to have a game licence to shoot game.

Gamekeepers
The Act listed requirements on the appointment of gamekeepers, and the issuing of a gamekeepers licence on an estate.

Other birds
Although not included in this Act, a game licence was required to shoot woodcock and common snipe until 1 August 2007. Wildfowl are protected and their close seasons stated under the Wildlife and Countryside Act 1981.

References
Halsbury's Statutes of England. Third Edition. Butterworths. London. 1969. Volume 14. Pages 448 to 469.
"The Game Act, 1831". Halsbury's Statutes of England. (The Complete Statutes of England). First Edition. 1929. Volume 8:   . Page 1066.
J M Lely. "The Game Act, 1831". The Statutes of Practical Utility. (Chitty's Statutes). Fifth Edition. Sweet and Maxwell. Stevens and Sons. London. 1894. Volume 4. Title "Game". Pages 5 to 23.
Welsby and Beavan. Chitty's Collection of Statutes, with Notes thereon. Third Edition. Henry Sweet. Stevens and Sons. London. 1865. Volume 2. Title "Game". Pages 234 to 249.
James Paterson. "Game Act". The Game Laws of the United Kingdom. Shaw and Sons. London. 1861. Pages 1 to 83.
John Locke. The Game Laws. Second Edition. Shaw and Sons. London. 1840. Pages 1 to 60. Fourth Edition. 1856. Pages 93 to 178.
William Gurdon. "New Game Act". The Statutes in Force Relating to the Preserving and Killing of Game. Saunders and Benning. London. 1839. Pages 47 to 99.
John Collyer. The Criminal Statutes of England. Printed for S Sweet. London. Printed for W Wrightson. Birmingham. 1832. Pages 698 to 711. Note is at pages 710 and 711.
A F Jenkin. "The Game Act, 1831". The Law Relating to Parish Councils. Knight & Co. London. 1894. Pages 396 to 398.
Pudney v Eccles (1892) 17 Cox CC 594

Notes

External links
Defra Game Birds

UK Legislation 

United Kingdom Acts of Parliament 1831
Hunting and shooting in the United Kingdom